Mount Feake Cemetery is a historic cemetery at 203 Prospect Street in Waltham, Massachusetts.

Overview
Established in 1857, it is the city's second cemetery, after Grove Hill Cemetery, and is one of the best-preserved garden cemeteries in the state. It takes its name from its highest point, Mount Feake, which was named by Governor John Winthrop in 1632 for his future nephew-in-law, Robert Feake, one of the founding settlers of Watertown, Massachusetts. The cemetery was listed on the National Register of Historic Places in 1989.

Mount Feake Cemetery was designed by Robert Morris Copeland, and was from its inception compared to the older Mount Auburn Cemetery in Cambridge. It stands on a somewhat rugged parcel of land that rises above the Charles River across from the Waltham Watch Company complex. A series of winding lanes, designed to complement the terrain, provide access to all parts of the cemetery. Most of the grave markers are made of granite, although marble and limestone are also well-represented.

One unusual item once added some romantic charm to the cemetery.  The remains of a brick water pumping station, built in 1872 and enlarged in 1896-97, stood on the grounds of the cemetery, and provided a picturesque ruin to the environment.  Adjacent to this building stood two Italianate houses, as well as a carriage house and sheds, that were historically associated with the pumping station.  All of these buildings were demolished, probably in the late 20th century.

Images

See also
National Register of Historic Places listings in Waltham, Massachusetts

References

Buildings and structures in Waltham, Massachusetts
Cemeteries on the National Register of Historic Places in Massachusetts
Italianate architecture in Massachusetts
1857 establishments in Massachusetts
Cemeteries in Middlesex County, Massachusetts
National Register of Historic Places in Waltham, Massachusetts
Rural cemeteries